Willie Amos (born July 28, 1982) is an American football defensive back who most recently played for the Edmonton Eskimos of the Canadian Football League. 

Amos was born in Sweetwater, Texas and attended Sweetwater High School.  He is a champion jump rope skipper. In 1999, he jumped with Team USA at the FISAC World Jump Rope Championships and won in the all-male senior division.

Amos played safety his first year at the University of Nebraska.  He tore his ACL during training, and sat out for a year. He came back in the 2003 season to play left cornerback his junior year.  Amos was switched to wide receiver his senior season in 2004 and recorded 2 touchdowns in his debut performance.

Amos is a Christian athlete and a member of Epsilon Rho chapter of the Iota Phi Theta fraternity.  On January 26, 2008, Amos was drafted by Team Texas of the AAFL in the 10th round. 

He previously played for the Winnipeg Blue Bombers (until he was traded to the Eskimos on June 14, 2009 for offensive linemen Thaddeus Coleman). Before that he was on the practice squad of the Chicago Bears, who signed him as an undrafted free agent.  He played college football at Nebraska.  

Injured several times during his tenure with the Eskimos, he was released in June 2010.  He continues to give jump rope demonstrations and has a fitness company. Amos is also the jump rope coach for the Jumpin' Jammers, located in Euless, Texas.

References

External links
Bio at Nebraska Cornhuskers football official website

1982 births
Living people
American football cornerbacks
Chicago Bears players
Edmonton Elks players
Nebraska Cornhuskers football players
People from Sweetwater, Texas